Gorenja Stara Vas is a village in the Municipality of Šentjernej in southeastern Slovenia. The area is part of the traditional region of Lower Carniola. It is now included in the Southeast Slovenia Statistical Region.

The local church, built on the northeastern outskirts of the village, is dedicated to Saint Thomas and belongs to the Parish of Šentjernej. It is a medieval structure that was greatly rebuilt in the Baroque style in the early 18th century.

References

External links
Gorenja Stara Vas on Geopedia

Populated places in the Municipality of Šentjernej